Yuk Ji-dam ((), sometimes known as Jidam or Yukji; born March 10, 1997) is a South Korean rapper from Daegu. She gained popularity with her participation on the Hip Hop TV competitions Show Me The Money and Unpretty Rapstar. She returned to Unpretty Rapstar 3 as a contestant.

Early life 
Yuk Ji-dam was born in Daegu on March 10, 1997. In the years she attended school, she was reportedly bullied and made fun of because of her dark skin. Eventually, she grew inspired by Yoon Mi-rae's song "Black Happiness", which is about growing half-black in an Asian conservative country. This led to her interest in hip hop music.

Discography

Singles

Also she collaborated with Hyuna in song 'Ice Ice' A+ (EP)

Filmography

Variety shows

References 

1997 births
Living people
South Korean women rappers
Unpretty Rapstar contestants
21st-century South Korean women singers
21st-century South Korean singers
South Korean hip hop singers
Yuk clan